PC Magazine (shortened as PCMag) is an American computer magazine published by Ziff Davis. A print edition was published from 1982 to January 2009. Publication of online editions started in late 1994 and have continued to the present day.

Overview 
PC Magazine provides reviews and previews of the latest hardware and software for the information technology professional. Articles are written by leading experts including John C. Dvorak, whose regular column and "Inside Track" feature were among the magazine's most popular attractions. Other regular departments include columns by long-time editor-in-chief Michael J. Miller ("Forward Thinking"), Bill Machrone, and Jim Louderback, as well as:
 "First Looks" (a collection of reviews of newly released products)
 "Pipeline" (a collection of short articles and snippets on computer-industry developments)
 "Solutions" (which includes various how-to articles)
 "User-to-User" (a section in which the magazine's experts answer user-submitted questions)
 "After Hours" (a section about various computer entertainment products; the designation "After Hours" is a legacy of the magazine's traditional orientation towards business computing.)
 "Abort, Retry, Fail?" (a beginning-of-the-magazine humor page which for a few years was known as "Backspace"—and was subsequently the last page).

For a number of years in the 1980s PC Magazine gave significant coverage to programming for the IBM PC and compatibles in languages such as Turbo Pascal, BASIC, Assembly and C. Charles Petzold was one of the notable writers on programming topics.

Editor Bill Machrone wrote in 1985 that "we've distilled the contents of PC Magazine down to the point where it can be expressed as a formula: PC = EP2. EP stands for evaluating products and enhancing productivity. If an article doesn't do one or the other, chances are it doesn't belong in PC Magazine."

History 
In an early review of the new IBM PC, Byte reported "the announcement of a new magazine called PC: The Independent Guide to the IBM Personal Computer. It is published by David Bunnell, of Software Communications, Inc. ... It should be of great interest to owners of the IBM Personal Computer". The first issue of PC, dated February–March 1982, appeared early that year. (The word Magazine was added to the name with the third issue in June 1982, but not added to the logo until January 1986.) PC Magazine was created by Bunnell, Jim Edlin, and Cheryl Woodard (who also helped David found the subsequent PC World and Macworld magazines).  David Bunnell, Edward Currie and Tony Gold were the magazines co-founders. Bunnell and Currie created the magazine's business plan at Lifeboat Associates in New York which included, in addition to PC Magazine, explicit plans for publication of PC Tech, PC Week and PC Expositions (PC Expo) all of which were subsequently realized. Tony Gold, a co-founder of Lifeboat Associates financed the magazine in the early stages. The magazine grew beyond the capital required to publish it, and to solve this problem, Gold sold the magazine to Ziff-Davis, moving from California to New York City. By February 1983 it was published by PC Communications Corp., a subsidiary of Ziff-Davis Publishing Co., Bunnell and his staff left to form PC World magazine.

The first issue of PC featured an interview with Bill Gates, made possible by his friendship with David Bunnell who was among the first journalists and writers to take an interest in personal computing.

By its third issue PC was square-bound because it was too thick for saddle-stitch. At first the magazine published new issues every two months, but became monthly as of the August 1982 issue, its fourth. In March 1983 a reader urged the magazine to consider switching to a biweekly schedule because of its thickness, and in June another joked of the dangers of falling asleep while reading PC in bed. Although the magazine replied to the reader's proposal with "Please say you're kidding about the bi-weekly schedule. Please?", after the December 1983 issue reached 800 pages in size, in 1984 PC began publishing new issues every two weeks, with each about 400 pages in size. In January 2008 the magazine dropped back to monthly issues. Print circulation peaked at 1.2 million in the late 1990s. In November 2008 it was announced that the print edition would be discontinued as of the January 2009 issue, but the online version at pcmag.com would continue. By this time print circulation had declined to about 600,000. In the December 2022 issue, it was announced that the issue is the last one following the magazine format, and the focus was shifted to the pcmag.com website.

PC Magazine uses Google Books as the official archive of its 27 years as a print publication.

Editor 
Wendy Sheehan Donnell is the current editor-in-chief of PCMag.com.
Prior to this position, Donnell was deputy editor under the previous editor-in-chief, Dan Costa.
Costa was editor-in-chief from August 2011 to December 2021. Lance Ulanoff held the position of editor-in-chief from July 2007 to July 2011.

Jim Louderback was editor-in-chief before Ulanoff, from 2005, and left when he accepted the position of chief executive officer of Revision3, an online media company.

Development and evolution 

The magazine has evolved significantly over the years. The most drastic change has been the shrinkage of the publication due to contractions in the computer-industry ad market and the easy availability of the Internet, which has tended to make computer magazines less "necessary" than they once were. This is also the primary reason for the November 2008 decision to discontinue  the print version.  Where once mail-order vendors had huge listing of products in advertisements covering several pages, there is now a single page with a reference to a website. At one time (the 1980s through the mid-1990s), the magazine averaged about 400 pages an issue, with some issues breaking the 500- and even 600-page marks. In the late 1990s, as the computer-magazine field underwent a drastic pruning, the magazine shrank to approximately 300 and then 200 pages.

It has adapted to the new realities of the 21st century by reducing its once-standard emphasis on massive comparative reviews of computer systems, hardware peripherals, and software packages to focus more on the broader consumer-electronics market (including cell phones, PDAs, MP3 players, digital cameras, and so on). Since the late 1990s, the magazine has taken to more frequently reviewing Macintosh software and hardware.

The magazine practically invented the idea of comparative hardware and software reviews in 1984 with a groundbreaking "Project Printers" issue. For many years thereafter, the blockbuster annual printer issue, featuring more than 100 reviews, was a PC Magazine tradition.

PC Magazine was one of the first publications to have a formal test facility called PC Labs. The name was used early in the magazine but it was not until PC Labs was actually built at the magazine's 1 Park Avenue, New York facility that it became a real entity in 1986. William Wong was the first PC Labs Director. PC Labs created a series of benchmarks and older versions can still be found on the internet. PC Labs was designed to help writers and editors to evaluate PC hardware and software especially for large projects like the annual printer edition where almost a hundred printers were compared using PC Labs printer benchmarks.

The publication also took on a series of editorial causes over the years, including copy protection (the magazine refused to grant its coveted Editors' Choice award to any product that used copy protection) and the "brain-dead" Intel 80286 (then-editor-in-chief Bill Machrone said the magazine would still review 286s but would not recommend them).

PC Magazine was a booster of early versions of the OS/2 operating system in the late 1980s, but then switched to a strong endorsement of the Microsoft Windows operating environment after the release of Windows 3.0 in May 1990. Some OS/2 users accused of the magazine of ignoring OS/2 2.x versions and later.  (Columnist Charles Petzold was sharply critical of Windows because it was more fragile and less stable and robust than OS/2, but he observed the reality that Windows succeeded in the marketplace where OS/2 failed, so the magazine by necessity had to switch coverage from OS/2 to Windows. In the April 28, 1992 issue PC Magazine observed that the new OS/2 2.0 was "exceptionally stable" compared to Windows 3.x due to "bullet-proof memory protection" that prevented an errant application from crashing the OS, albeit at the cost of higher system requirements.)

During the dot-com bubble, the magazine began focusing heavily on many of the new Internet businesses, prompting complaints from some readers that the magazine was abandoning its original emphasis on computer technology. After the collapse of the technology bubble in the early 2000s, the magazine returned to a more traditional approach.

See also 
 Macworld
 PC World
 DOS Power Tools

References

External links 
 
Archived PC magazines on the Internet Archive
Digitized PC magazines on Google Books

Monthly magazines published in the United States
Video game magazines published in the United States
Arabic-language magazines
Magazines published in Belgium
Biweekly magazines published in the United States
Magazines published in Brazil
Magazines published in Bulgaria
Chinese-language magazines
Online computer magazines
Defunct computer magazines published in the United States
Computer magazines published in the Netherlands
Computer game magazines published in the Netherlands
English-language magazines
Magazines published in Greece
Greek-language magazines
Home computer magazines
Magazines published in Israel
Magazines established in 1982
Magazines disestablished in 2009
Magazines published in New York (state)
Magazines published in Mexico
Online magazines with defunct print editions
Portuguese-language magazines
Magazines published in Romania
Monthly magazines published in Russia
Computer magazines published in Russia
Video game magazines published in Russia
Computer magazines published in Serbia
Serbian-language magazines
Magazines published in Singapore
Spanish-language magazines
Computer magazines published in Spain
Video game magazines published in Spain